Sandra E. Clark is an American diplomat.

Sandra Clark may also refer to:
Sandra Clark (British actress), Scottish actress who featured in the TV series The Mackinnons (1977) and Me and My Girl (1985–1988)
Sandra Clark (American actress), American actress known for her role in the film Scream for Help (1984)
Sandra Clark, a fictional character on the TV series 227